František Kubík (born 14 March 1989) is a Slovak footballer who plays as a winger or a left back for an amateur side OFK Lehota pod Vtáčnikom.

Club career
Kubík started his career in hometown club HFK Prievidza. In winter 2008, he  moved to the Second Division club AS Trenčín. In summer 2009, ADO coach John van den Brom noticed Kubík at pre-season football tournament in the Netherlands. After a year he has signed one-year loan for ADO Den Haag. He made his ADO debut against Vitesse Arnhem on 8 August 2010 and first goal scored against Roda JC on 15 August 2010. He overall scored 9 goals in 2010–11, 8 in Eredivisie and 1 in the European competition play-off.

On 5 June 2011, Kubík signed 4-year contract for Russian club FC Kuban. He made his Kuban debut in a 5–0 win against FC Volga on 21 August 2011. He played for Kuban only 5 matches and was transferred to Ukrainian club SC Tavriya Simferopol on 12 February 2012.

International career
He made his debut for the Slovakia national football team in friendly match against Luxembourg on 9 February 2011.

External links
 
  Voetbal International

1989 births
Living people
Association football forwards
Slovak footballers
Slovakia international footballers
AS Trenčín players
ADO Den Haag players
ŠK Slovan Bratislava players
MŠK Žilina players
FC Kuban Krasnodar players
SC Tavriya Simferopol players
FC Arsenal Kyiv players
Ergotelis F.C. players
FC Atyrau players
FK Frýdek-Místek players
FC Petržalka players
Eredivisie players
Russian Premier League players
Ukrainian Premier League players
Slovak expatriate footballers
Expatriate footballers in the Netherlands
Expatriate footballers in Russia
Expatriate footballers in Ukraine
Expatriate footballers in Greece
Expatriate footballers in Kazakhstan
Slovak expatriate sportspeople in the Netherlands
Slovak expatriate sportspeople in Russia
People from Prievidza
Sportspeople from the Trenčín Region